Benaroya Research Institute (BRI) is a Seattle, Washington non-profit organization that conducts medical research on many diseases and immune disorders, including autoimmune disease. It is affiliated with Virginia Mason Health System, and is located on the campus of Virginia Mason Medical Center.

Much of BRI's research aims to understand how immune cells function and why they malfunction to cause disease. BRI researchers study how immune cells contribute to rheumatoid arthritis, type 1 diabetes, multiple sclerosis, and other diseases.

BRI uses translational research and clinical trials to carry its findings from the lab to the clinic, to inform how physicians diagnose and treat disease.

History
BRI was founded in 1956 as the Virginia Mason Research Center." In 1985, Gerald Nepom became BRI's director and established its immunology research program.

In 1999, BRI moved into a new, 100,000 square-foot building at the corner of Seneca and 9th Avenue, in Seattle's First Hill neighborhood. The building was named the Benaroya Research Institute in honor of donations from the Benaroya family.

In the late 1990s, BRI's William Kwok and Nepom developed MHC class II tetramer technology that helps researchers find and study antigen-specific T cells. These tetramers are customized (using different HLA/peptide combinations) for use by researchers to study how the immune system responds to many different diseases and pathogens, including influenza, human papillomavirus, allergies, type 1 diabetes, rheumatoid arthritis and multiple sclerosis.

In 2016, Jane Buckner took over from Nepom and became BRI's president." Nepom remained at BRI as a researcher and faculty member.

Research
BRI studies immune cells and immunotherapies that reprogram those cells; these therapies could inform treatments and cures for type 1 diabetes, multiple sclerosis, rheumatoid arthritis and other diseases.

BRI's uses its biorepositories of blood and specimens from individuals with autoimmune diseases and other disorders, and from healthy individuals to conduct research. BRI has eight biorepositories that contain samples dating back to the year 2000.

In 2014, BRI was awarded a seven year, $27 million per-year grant to become headquarters of the Immune Tolerance Network (ITN), a clinical research consortium with more than 200 research sites around the world. The ITN investigates how to retrain the immune system to tolerate organ transplants and reduce the effects of allergies, autoimmune diseases and other health issues. The ITN is directed by Nepom.

BRI's Carla Greenbaum is chair  of Type 1 Diabetes TrialNet. TrialNet is an international research network that is pursuing new ways to identify, slow the progression of and ultimately prevent type 1 diabetes.

In 2016, BRI received a five-year, $8 million NIH grant to lead a collaboration that studies how the immune system responds to allergens in the lungs, and how those allergens trigger asthma attacks. The collaboration includes researchers from BRI, UW Medicine and Seattle Children's Research Institute. Their work could lead to new therapies for allergies and asthma.

BRI is also studying immunotherapies to treat type 1 diabetes. In 2016, Buckner and her colleagues received $1 million from the Leona M. and Harry B. Helmsley Charitable Trust to investigate ways to change "attacker" cells into cells that stop disease. The researchers are isolating the cells that mount autoimmune attacks, and then "reprogramming" them by editing their genes.

In 2017, the Helmsley Trust awarded the researchers an additional $2 million to continue testing the edited cells in the lab.

In 2017, BRI's Erik Wambre and his colleagues identified a type of cell, called Th2A, that appears to drive all allergies. This discovery could change the trajectory of allergy research and treatment by informing to therapies that target this common enemy. Th2A cells could also be used as biomarkers, or indicators to show whether a person has an allergy or is responding to therapy.

In 2018, BRI's Emma L. Kuan and Steven F. Ziegler discovered that a protein called thymic stromal lymphopoietin (TSLP) helps breast cancer tumors survive and spread. They also showed that blocking this protein in laboratory models significantly inhibited the growth of breast cancer tumors and kept them from spreading. Kuan and Ziegler are investigating if drugs that block TSLP might be effective against breast cancer.

In 2018, BRI researchers contributed to a finding about babies’ sleep patterns: Many infants sleep better and for longer when they start eating solid foods. In the study, half the babies subsisted entirely on breast milk until six months of age, while the other half started eating solid foods at three months of age. Compared to babies who were solely breast-fed, the infants who ate solid food slept for two more hours per week and woke up two fewer times per night. The findings were published in JAMA Pediatrics, and the study was led by Gideon Lack, a professor at King's College London whose work is funded by the Immune Tolerance Network – which is housed at BRI.

In 2018, BRI's Bernard Khor was awarded an NIH grant to investigate why nearly 50 percent of people with Down syndrome (DS) have autoimmune diseases. Khor and BRI are building one of the world's first DS biorepositories to study why people with DS are so susceptible to autoimmune diseases. Dr. Khor's team will use these samples to analyze immune cells from patients with DS and patients with both DS and autoimmune disease. The researchers will compare their findings to samples from the patients’ healthy family members. This could lead to insights about autoimmune diseases and inform therapies to treat them.

BRI's Peter Linsley contributed to research that helped James Allison and Tasuku Honjo win the Nobel Prize for Physiology and Medicine in December 2018. Allison and Honjo received the prize for research related to checkpoint inhibitor therapies for cancer. Linsley is BRI's Director of Systems Immunology, and his research on T cell activation in the early 1990s significantly contributed to the body of knowledge that later helped Allison and Honjo pioneer this breakthrough approach.  

In March 2019, Margaret McCormick, PhD, became BRI’s Executive Director after their previous director, Homer Lane, retired.

In June 2019, BRI and Type 1 Diabetes TrialNet showed that an immunotherapy drug called teplizumab delayed T1D for a median of two years for those at high risk for the disease. This is the first time scientists have been able to use a therapy to delay type 1 diabetes.

BRI started conducting cancer research in 2014, in part to investigate why cancer patients developed autoimmunity as a side effect of taking checkpoint inhibitor immunotherapy. In 2019, BRI received two grants to learn more about this cancer-autoimmunity connection. In May 2019, they received a grant from the Parker Institute for Cancer Immunotherapy, JDRF, and The Leona M. and Harry B. Helmsley Charitable Trust to study why some checkpoint inhibitor patients develop an autoimmune response that resembles type 1 diabetes. In September 2019, BRI received a $4.5 million grant from the National Cancer Institute to study why immunotherapy only works for some people, and why it triggers an autoimmune response in others.

In December 2019, BRI launched the Sound Life Project, which aims to profile the healthy human immune system to lay the groundwork for better ways to diagnose, treat and prevent immune system diseases such as rheumatoid arthritis, type 1 diabetes and multiple sclerosis. Scientists will examine the immune systems of healthy volunteers in two age segments (25-35 and 55-65) over two years with the goal of understanding what constitutes a “normal” baseline of young and aging immune systems, as well as other lifestyle and environmental factors that may influence it. The Sound Life Project is BRI’s initial project of a research collaboration led by the new Allen Institute for Immunology. BRI’s role is to provide detailed information about healthy immune systems to serve as a foundation for existing and future disease research programs.

In March 2020, BRI launched a Gut Immunity program. This program brings together three scientists, Adam Lacy-Hulbert, PhD, James Lord, MD, PhD, and Oliver Harrison, DPhil, who study different aspects of diseases that impact the gut. Their goal is to create better treatments and cures for diseases like Crohn’s disease, ulcerative colitis and celiac disease. 

In July 2020, BRI announced that the National Institutes of Health awarded them over $5.8 million to study COVID-19. This work includes examining why some people who have the virus get severely ill and others have no symptoms; COVID-19’s impact on lung tissue; and why some patients have an overactive inflammatory response called a cytokine storm.

In early August 2020, BRI and Seattle Children’s announced a licensing deal with biotech startup GentiBio. The partnership aims to use engineered regulatory T cells to treat autoimmune and allergic diseases.

In late August 2020, BRI researchers discovered a new pathway that can help protect cells from viruses including COVID-19 and Ebola. They found that one gene, CIITA, can help human cells resist the virus by activating another gene, CD74 p41. When activated, the second gene stops the virus from infecting your cells. They used a novel technique called transposon-mediated gene activation to pinpoint which genes prevent infection.

In fall 2020, BRI became a testing site for the Pfizer vaccine Phase III trial. About 100 people are participating in this two-year trial. BRI’s team collected data about if the vaccine prevented COVID-19 infections and side effects participants experienced and is continuing to monitor participants.

In November 2020, BRI President Jane Buckner, MD, was named a Woman of Influence by the Puget Sound Business Journal. She was one of 18 honorees out of 222 nominees. The award is given to leaders who make a lasting impact on their industries and communities.

In December 2020, Jessica Hamerman, PhD, was awarded a $200,000 research grant from the Lupus Research Alliance. She is studying an autoantibody called IgA that’s present in about half of people with lupus. She aims to find out if IgA plays a role in causing the disease and, if so, how if it could be a drug target to inform better treatments for lupus.

Funding and growth
BRI has received United States federal grants for research for a wide variety of research projects, including research on autoimmune diseases, allergies and asthma.

In 2010, BRI became the main beneficiary of the annual Boeing Classic golf tournament. The Boeing Classic has raised more than $6 million from 2005 to 2017 for BRI and other charities.

In 2015, BRI ranked third in National Institutes of Health funding among Washington State research institutions.

In 2016, BRI's annual budget was approximately $70 million. Approximately 71 percent of BRI's 2016 research was supported by government research grants and contracts. The remaining revenues came from philanthropic donations, pharmaceutical studies, foundation grants and other sources.

References

External links

Non-profit organizations based in Seattle
Research institutes in Seattle